Khwaja Sayyid Mir Alauddin ibn Muhammad Attar, was a Sufi Saint from Bukhara and Qutb of the Naqshbandi Sufi order. He was a descendant of Muhammad and son in law of his master and predecessor Khwaja Bahauddin Naqshband.

Biography 

Alauddin Attar was born in Khwarezm in a Sayyid household. His father was Khwaja Muhammad Khwarezmi who has also been an islamic scholar and Sufi Saint. Khwaja Alauddin Attar was born as Muhammad ibn Muhammad, who then changed his name with the grace of his master Bahauddin Naqshband, due to his superiority as Sufi Saint. Ala, denotes superiority, and din, religion, which was entitled to him.

Alauddin Attar started learning Islamic Sciences from a very young age and accomplished his studies as a young teenager graduating from all contemporary teachers in Bukhara. After his father's demise, he gave all his inheritance from his father to his little brothers. He then got to know Bahauddin Naqshband, who realized his talent.

Alauddin and his master had a very strong emotional relationship that held lifelong. Historical sources compare this relationship with the relationship Jacob had to his son Joseph, for Bahauddin had no son of his own. Bahauddin was so anstonished because of Alauddin's potential as Saint that legends say, he had seen Muhammad himself in a dream, who ordered him to give his daughter's hands in marriage to his descendant Alauddin.

Alauddin issued Khwaja Hasan and Khwaja Hussein, who were the spiritual and judicial heirs of Bahauddin, for he only had two daughters.

Ancestry 
According to old historical sources Khwaja Alauddin's ancestry traces back to Muhammad after 19 generations. 
His lineage is as follows:

 Muhammad
 Fatima al Zahra and Ali ibn Abi Talib
 Imam Hussein ibn Ali
 Imam Ali ibn Hussein Zayn al Abideen
 Imam Muhammad Al-Baqir
 Imam Jafar al-Sadiq
 Imam Musa Al-Kadhim
 Al-Amir Sayyid Mir Ibrahim ibn Musa al-Murtadha
 Sayyid Mir Abu Bakr
 Sayyid Mir Abdul-Haq
 Sayyid Mir Jafar
 Sayyid Mir Muhammad Rumi
 Sayyid Mir Abdullah
 Sayyid Mir Musa
 Sayyid Mir Hussein
 Sayyid Mir Qasim
 Sayyid Mir Abu Bakr Reza
 Sayyid Mir Abdullah Zarbaksh
 Sayyid Mir Muhammad Khwarezmi
 Qutb ul Aqtab, Sayyid ul Sadaat, Khwaja-e-Khwajagan Muhammad Alauddin Attar

Legacy 
He taught many accomplished scholars, like Khwaja Yaqub Charkhi, dedicated himself to many charity projects and advised the contemporary rulers, who asked him for advices. His descendants follow his footsteps until today. His descendants are prominent Sufi Saints, Sheikh ul Islam, Grand Muftis, preachers, Commanders and diplomats. His bloodline and line of succession goes through his two sons Hasan and Hussein. His descendant after 6 Generations Hazrat Ishaan was with official consent of the Mughal Empire the head of the household of Alauddin Attar and Bahauddin Naqshband. Through this line the three Sayyid brothers Sayyid Mir Jan, Sayyid Mahmud Agha and Sayyid Mir Fazlullah Agha upheld the traditions of their ancestor Alauddin Attar.

See Also (descendants)
Hazrat Ishaan
Moinuddin Hadi Naqshband
Sayyid Mir Jan
Sayyid Mahmud Agha
Sayyid Mir Fazlullah Agha

References

Sources 
 

Sufi saints
1330s births
1400s deaths